Heppnerographa is a genus of moths belonging to the family Tortricidae.

Species
Heppnerographa arammclaina  Razowski, 1987 
Heppnerographa ardea  Razowski & Becker, 1999 
Heppnerographa brasiliana  Razowski & Becker, 1999 
Heppnerographa carchiana  Razowski & Becker, 1999 
Heppnerographa chrysotona  Razowski & Pelz, 2005 
Heppnerographa circinnata  Razowski & Wojtusiak, 2006
Heppnerographa ecuatorica  Razowski & Becker, 1999 
Heppnerographa lapilla  Razowski & Becker, 1999 
Heppnerographa longibarba  Razowski & Pelz, 2005 
Heppnerographa podocarpi  Razowski & Pelz, 2005
Heppnerographa tricesimana  Zeller, 1877 
Heppnerographa usitica  Razowski & Pelz, 2005

Former species
Heppnerographa bathychtra  Razowski & Pelz, 2005 
Heppnerographa grapholithana  Razowski & Pelz, 2005 
Heppnerographa monotana  Razowski & Pelz, 2005

References

 , 1987, Bull. Acad. Pol. Sci., Sr. Sci. Biol. 35: 63.
 , 2005, World Catalogue of Insects volume 5 Tortricidae
 , 2006: Tortricidae from Venezuela (Lepidoptera: Tortricidae). Shilap Revista de Lepidopterologia 34 133): 35-79

External links
tortricidae.com

 
Tortricidae genera
Taxa named by Józef Razowski